Tylopilus hondurensis is a bolete fungus in the family Boletaceae. Found in Honduras, where it grows under Pinus oocarpa, it was described as new to science in 1983.

References

External links

hondurensis
Fungi described in 1983
Fungi of Central America